Alton is a city on the Mississippi River in Madison County, Illinois, United States, about  north of St. Louis, Missouri. The population was 25,676 at the 2020 census. It is a part of the River Bend area in the Metro-East region of the Greater St. Louis metropolitan area. It is famous for its limestone bluffs along the river north of the city, as the former location of the state penitentiary, and for its role preceding and during the American Civil War. It was the site of the last Abraham Lincoln and Stephen Douglas debate in October 1858. The former state penitentiary in Alton was used during the Civil War to hold up to 12,000 Confederate prisoners of war.

History

Although Alton once was growing faster than the nearby city of St. Louis, a coalition of St. Louis businessmen planned to build a competing town to stop Alton's expansion and bring business to St. Louis. The resulting town was Grafton, Illinois.

Many blocks of housing in Alton were built in the Victorian Queen Anne style. They represent a prosperous period in the river city's history. At the top of the hill in the commercial area, several stone churches and a fine city hall also represent the city's wealth during its good times based on river traffic, manufacturing and shipping. It was a commercial center for a large agricultural area. Numerous residences on hills have sweeping views of the Mississippi River.

Early history
The Alton area was home to Native Americans for thousands of years before the 19th-century founding by European Americans of the modern city. Historic accounts indicate occupation of this area by the Illiniwek or Illinois Confederacy at the time of European contact. Earlier native settlement is demonstrated by archaeological artifacts and the famous prehistoric Piasa bird painted on a cliff face nearby. The image was described in 1673 by French missionary priest Father Jacques Marquette.

19th century
Alton was developed as a river town in January 1818 by Rufus Easton, who named it after his son. Easton ran a passenger ferry service across the Mississippi River to the Missouri shore. Alton is located amid the confluence of three navigable rivers: the Illinois, the Mississippi, and the Missouri. Alton grew into a river trading town with an industrial character. The city rises steeply from the waterfront, where massive concrete grain silos and railroad tracks were constructed in the 19th and 20th centuries to store and ship the area's grains and produce. Brick commercial buildings are spread throughout downtown. Once the site of several brick factories, Alton has an unusually high number of streets still paved in brick. The lower levels of Alton are subject to floods, many of which have inundated the historic downtown area. The dates of different flood levels are marked on the large grain silos, part of the Ardent Mills, near the Argosy Casino at the waterfront. The flood of 1993 is considered the worst of the last century.

Alton became an important town for abolitionists, as Illinois was a free state across from the slave state of Missouri. Pro-slavery activists also lived there and slave catchers often raided the city. Escaped slaves would cross the Mississippi to seek shelter in Alton, and proceed to safer places through stations of the Underground Railroad. During the years before the American Civil War, several homes were equipped with tunnels and hiding places for stations on the Underground Railroad to aid slaves escaping to the North. On November 7, 1837, the abolitionist printer Reverend Elijah P. Lovejoy was murdered by a pro-slavery mob while he tried to protect his Alton-based press from being destroyed for the third time. He had moved from St. Louis because of opposition there. He had printed many abolitionist tracts and distributed them throughout the area. When one of the mob made a move to set the old warehouse on fire, Lovejoy, armed with only a pistol, went outside to try to stop him. The pro-slavery man shot him dead (with a shotgun, five rounds through the midsection). The mob stormed the warehouse and threw Lovejoy's printing press into the Mississippi. Lovejoy thus became the first martyr of the abolition movement.

Alton became the seat of a diocese of the Catholic Church in 1857. Its first bishop was French-born Henry Damian Juncker. The new diocese had 58 churches, 18 priests and 50,000 Catholics. When he died, 11 years later, the churches were 125, the priests more than 100, and the Catholics 80,000. He was succeeded by Peter Joseph Baltes from Germany (1869–1886) and James Ryan (1888–1923). In 1923 the bishop's seat was moved to Springfield, Illinois. The Diocese of Alton, no longer a residential bishopric, is today listed by the Catholic Church as a titular see. Titular bishops appointed to the see have been John Clayton Nienstedt and Josu Iriondo.

On October 15, 1858, Alton was the site of the seventh Lincoln-Douglas debate. A memorial at the site in downtown Alton features oversized statues of Lincoln and Douglas, as they would have appeared during the debate. Congressional representatives came to Alton when they drafted the Thirteenth Amendment of the Constitution, to permanently end slavery throughout the Union. Alton resident and US Senator Lyman Trumbull, chairman of the Senate Judiciary Committee, co-wrote the Thirteenth Amendment. His Alton home, the Lyman Trumbull House, is a National Historic Monument.

Just two weeks into the American Civil War, Alton played a role in the infamous Camp Jackson Affair, which led to the eviction of Missouri Governor Claiborne Fox Jackson from office. The State of Missouri's neutrality was tested in a conflict over the St. Louis Arsenal. The Federal Government reinforced the Arsenal's tiny garrison with several detachments, including a force from the 2nd Infantry under Captain Nathaniel Lyon. Concerned by widespread reports that Governor Jackson intended to use the Missouri Volunteer Militia to attack the Arsenal and capture its 39,000 small arms, Secretary of War Simon Cameron ordered Lyon (by that time in acting command) to evacuate the majority of the arms to Illinois. 21,000 guns were secretly evacuated to Alton, IL on the evening of April 29, 1861.

The first penitentiary in Illinois was built in Alton. While only a corner of it within a few blocks of the river remains, it once extended nearly to "Church Hill". During the American Civil War, Union forces used it to hold prisoners of war, and some 12,000 Confederates were held there. During the smallpox epidemic of 1863–1864, an estimated 1500–2200 men died. A Confederate mass grave on the north side of Alton holds many of the dead from the epidemic and a memorial marks the site. Often when Confederate prisoners escaped, they tried to cross the Mississippi River back to the slave state of Missouri.

20th century
Robert Pershing Wadlow, listed in the Guinness Book of Records as the world's tallest man at 8 feet 11.1 inches tall, 2.72 m, is buried in Oakwood Cemetery in the area known as Upper Alton. The earth over his grave was raised so visitors can compare its length to other graves. A memorial to him, including a life-sized statue and a replica of his chair, stands on College Avenue, across from the Southern Illinois University Dental School.

The Sisters of St Francis of the Martyr St George have their American province motherhouse in Alton.

In 1937 two commercial fishermen from Alton caught a bull shark in the Mississippi River. Late that summer they had realized something was troubling their wood and mesh traps. Concluding that it was a fish, they built a strong wire trap and baited it with chicken guts. The next morning, they caught the 5-foot 84-pound shark, which they displayed in the Calhoun Fish Market, where it attracted crowds for days.

World War II saw a group of seven brothers join the military and variously became decorated veterans. Among these were Millard Glen Gray, who was decorated by Douglas MacArthur, and Neil Gray, who received the Silver Star.

In 1954, the city of Alton was named as one of three finalists for the location of the new United States Air Force Academy. Alton lost to the winning site of Colorado Springs, Colorado.

Because of Alton's location at the Mississippi River, the Great Flood of 1993 with its high water levels caused severe damage to the city. Alton's water supply was cut off due to flooding, and townspeople had to be supplied with bottled water for more than three weeks. Many local businesses, including Anheuser-Busch of St. Louis, donated funds to help the people of Alton.

The original bridge connecting Alton with West Alton, Missouri, was a two-lane (one in each direction) bridge that had become a hazard for motorists and a hindrance for emergency vehicles. The northernmost bridge in the St. Louis metropolitan area, it was torn down in the 1990s. The current Clark Bridge, with two lanes of divided traffic in each direction, plus two bike lanes, opened in 1994. Work had proceeded during the Great Flood of 1993. The award-winning cable-stayed design was done by Hanson Engineers of Springfield, Illinois. Pieces of cables identical to those of the bridge were handed out in educational settings all over the city to allow the city's children to "take home a piece of the bridge". The complex work of construction of the bridge, in which engineers had to deal with the strong river current, barge traffic and the 1993 flood, was featured in the documentary Super Bridge on Nova.

21st century
In 2021, voters in the city elected David Goins as Alton's first black mayor.

Geography
Alton is located on the Mississippi River above the mouth of the Missouri River. Most of Alton is located on bluffs overlooking the river valley. The Meeting of the Great Rivers National Scenic Byway runs along the Alton riverfront. A monument and observatory tower, Confluence Tower, located next to the confluence of the Missouri and Mississippi Rivers in neighboring Hartford, IL, has been constructed to provide an overview of the Great Rivers area. This point also marks the beginning of the famous Lewis and Clark Expedition. Also on the river at Alton is Lock and Dam 26, the newest and busiest lock and dam complex on the main channel of the Mississippi River. On the Missouri side is the Audubon Center at Riverlands, which is one of the best places in the world to view birds, as it lies near where the Mississippi Flyway merges the flight paths of the Mississippi, Illinois and Missouri rivers. Also adjacent to the Audubon Center is the Jones-Confluence Point State Park, where one can stand at the confluence of the Missouri and Mississippi Rivers.

The National Great Rivers Museum is located at the new Lock and Dam No. 26, or Melvin Price Locks and Dam. The lock and dam are open for tours. The lock is a favorite spot to watch bald eagles, which feed on fish coming up in waters below the dam. A large bird sanctuary is located in an area of floodplain and wetlands on the west side of the river.

The River Road goes right next to the river north to Grafton. Above that, it is often routed inland of the floodplain. It provides views of the dramatic contrast between the high cliffs of the Illinois side to the broad, flat, green agricultural countryside of Portage des Sioux, Missouri. The Great River Road is a popular bicycle touring route. Hidden in a notch of the cliff is the tiny village of Elsah, once a down-and-dirty, liquor-soaked tugboaters' retreat, now with renovated properties and antique shops in historic houses.

Climate

Demographics

As of the census of 2000, there were 30,496 people, 12,518 households, and 7,648 families residing in the city. The racial makeup of the city was 72.3% White, 24.7% African American, 0.18% Native American, 0.4% Asian, <0.1% Pacific Islander, 0.7% from other races, and 1.7% from two or more races. Hispanic or Latino people of any race were 1.5% of the population.

There were 12,518 households, out of which 29.3% had children under the age of 18 living with them, 39.3% were married couples living together, 17.4% had a female householder with no husband present, and 38.9% were non-families. 33.3% of all households were made up of individuals, and 13.8% had someone living alone who was 65 years of age or older. The average household size was 2.36 and the average family size was 3.02.

In the city, the population was spread out, with 25.8% under the age of 18, 9.1% from 18 to 24, 29.1% from 25 to 44, 20.0% from 45 to 64, and 16.0% who were 65 years of age or older. The median age was 35 years. For every 100 females, there were 88.4 males. For every 100 females age 18 and over, there were 83.1 males.

The median income for a household in the city was $31,213, and the median income for a family was $37,910. Males had a median income of $33,083 versus $22,485 for females. The per capita income for the city was $16,817. About 14.7% of families and 18.7% of the population were below the poverty line, including 26.8% of those under age 18 and 13.2% of those age 65 or over.

Economy

In the late 19th and 20th centuries, Alton became a town of heavy industry and manufacturing. Laclede Steel established major steel manufacturing operations in the town. Local industry also includes Cope Plastics and Hanley Industries. Alton was home to once-thriving, now defunct, industries such as the Owens-Illinois Glass Bottle Works and Alton Box Board Company (a maker of all types of cardboard boxes for all types of uses).

Restructuring in the industry in the mid-20th century led Alton to create a new future. It has facilities for corporate and vacation retreats and it has transitioned into a popular tourist destination. Alton's location and historical heritage make it a popular destination for antique shopping, touring historic areas, and gambling aboard the Argosy Casino. Other Greater Alton attractions include Alton Marina; nine golf courses, including Spencer T. Olin, the only Arnold Palmer-designed and -managed course in Illinois or the St. Louis Metropolitan area; fine dining and night life; and a large selection of bed-and-breakfasts and guest houses. These include the Beall Mansion An Elegant Bed & Breakfast Inn, voted "Best Illinois Bed and Breakfast" in the Illinois Magazine Readers Poll. Billing itself as "the wedding capital of the Midwest", Alton has become a popular venue for weddings, receptions, and honeymoons.

Some visitors come to explore the natural environment of the area. A designated bikeway extends for miles north of town along the Mississippi River and below the limestone bluffs; its relatively flat grade and passage through tree-shaded areas makes it an easy ride for families. During the migration seasons, Alton is a destination for birdwatchers along the Mississippi Flyway; winter visitors come to see the bald eagles that roost on the Illinois limestone bluffs and feed on fish in the river. It is the area of the Meeting of the Great Rivers National Scenic Byway. A few miles to the north is Père Marquette State Park, with a WPA-era lodge and attractions including trails for hikers and riders, and horses for hire.

On January 28, 2010, Illinois was selected for a $1.2 billion federal award to bring high-speed passenger rail service to Illinois by 2015–2017. Alton has been selected as a station stop on a line running from St. Louis to Chicago, and opened on September 13, 2017.

Alton won the Small Business Revolution: Main Street contest and got a $100,000 boost to its community.

Arts and culture

Arts
Alton is home to the Jacoby Arts Center (JAC) (formerly the Madison County Arts Council), a not-for-profit organization that supports local arts and art education and is partially funded by the Illinois Arts Council. It is located on Broadway between Henry and Ridge Streets in the building that housed the Jacoby Furniture Store for nearly 100 years. The JAC is a regional arts center, serving 17 counties throughout south central Illinois, providing a public art gallery, art classes in a variety of media for adults and children, strong performing arts programming including a monthly live music performance, and an outlet to the literary arts, through such programs as the "Poetry Out Loud" high school-level competition and support of the Alton Writers Guild.

Alton is also home to the Alton Symphony Orchestra (ASO). In 2011, the ASO is in its 66th season, and is considered one of the premier community orchestras in the Midwest. Musicians range from young adults in their teens to senior citizens. It holds four regular season concerts, a stylish pops concert, and a children's concert; the symphony offers performances to entertain and educate diverse sectors of the community.

Theater

Founded in 1934 as a community theater, the Alton Little Theater continues to produce a full season of dramatic and comedic plays and musicals. Its all-volunteer members bring quality theater productions to Alton in an intimate setting. The Alton high schools all offer theatrical productions throughout the school year as well.

Alton Children's Theater, founded in 1958 by Solveig Sullivan, has provided live theater for children through the years. The plays are now held at Lewis and Clark Community College's Hatheway Hall. For many years, the company has performed for up to 10,000 children annually. This all-volunteer membership hires a professional director, who works with the members for the annual week of performances.

Landmarks

 The Piasa Bird painting, reproduction of original on the face of a cliff north-west of the city.
 Elijah P. Lovejoy Monument, a 110-foot tall memorial to the famous abolitionist and free speech advocate who was murdered by a pro-slavery mob. The monument is in Alton Cemetery on the bluffs.
 A monument to 1354 Confederate soldiers who died in the Alton prison, at the North Alton Confederate Cemetery.
 The Franklin House, later known as the Lincoln Hotel, and now the Lincoln Lofts. Lincoln dined here and may have stayed overnight when in Alton for his seventh debate with Stephen Douglas on October 15, 1858. Statues of Lincoln and Douglas mark Lincoln Douglas Square, at the corner of Landmarks and Broadway. This was the site of their last debate before the 1858 Illinois Senatorial Election.
 The Beall Mansion, designed by notable architect Lucas Pfeiffenberger and built in 1902 and 1903. It has been the private residence of Edmond Beall, four-time mayor of Alton and state senator.
 St. Peter and Paul Roman Catholic Church; more than 150 years old, it served as the Cathedral of the Diocese of Alton under three bishops (1857 to 1923). In 1923 the cathedral seat of the diocese was moved from Alton to Springfield.
 First Unitarian Church located at 110 E. Third Street, was built upon the foundation of St. Matthew's Catholic Church which had previously burned in the 1850s, is one of Alton's most popular ghost hunting sites in the city. The church is supposedly haunted by former pastor Philip Mercer who committed suicide on November 20, 1934, within the church. It was also a popular stop on the Underground Railroad during the Civil War.
 The Mineral Springs Hotel, located at 301 East Broadway, was opened in 1914 due to the natural spring located on the property. During its heyday, in 1918, Hollywood actress Marie Dressler spoke at the hotel on behalf of the Liberty Loan committee. The hotel closed in 1971 and became an outlet mall in 1978 and has been in operation ever since. It is also considered to be one of the most haunted places in the city, drawing ghosts hunters from all around the U.S. The current owner is Dan Hornsey, who also owns Dan's Upholstery on Broadway.
 A statue of Robert Pershing Wadlow, the tallest fully documented man in the recorded history of the world.
 The cable-stayed Clark Bridge (1994).
 Meeting of the Rivers National Scenic Byway, runs through the city adjacent to its Riverfront Park.
 Argosy Casino Alton, owned by Penn National Gaming.
 National Great Rivers Museum includes daily tours of Melvin Price Locks and Dam, the newest and busiest lock and dam complex on the main channel of the Mississippi River.
 Audubon Center at Riverlands on the south side of the Melvin Price Locks and Dam, includes a small museum and is a well-known spot for birding enthusiasts.
 Alton Riverfront Amphitheater in Alton's Riverfront Park, has views of the Mississippi River, Clark Bridge and Alton Marina.

Education
Based on 2006 district data, Alton Community Unit School District 11 enrollment stands at 6,480; the average number of teaching years in the district is 13.5; the high school graduation rate is 97.7%; the elementary pupil-teacher ratio is 18.9; and the secondary pupil-teacher ratio is 22.3. The Alton High School has an award-winning math team and music program. Alton High School offers an honors program.

Alton High School is the new public school, complete with a three-court gymnasium and six tennis courts.

The Alton Middle School is housed in the old Alton High School complex. Alton Middle School serves grades 6–8. The school is made up of three buildings: the main building, annex, and Olin Building. The Main building is the oldest. It is of architectural interest for its Romanesque design. Alton Middle School is the largest middle school in Illinois, with approximately 1,500 students.

The school system has a student program for 1st through 8th grades, covering the Middle School. This program gives participating students access to wider knowledge as well as special projects.

Marquette Catholic High School, named after the French explorer, Father Jacques Marquette, serves the area as well. Its sports teams are called the Explorers.

Alton was home to Shurtleff College from 1827 to 1957 and prominent military prep school Western Military Academy from 1879 to 1971. The Shurtleff campus is now the site of the Southern Illinois University School of Dental Medicine.

Media
Alton has one daily newspaper, The Telegraph, formerly the Alton Evening Telegraph. The Telegraph provides coverage of local news, as well as sports and relevant national news.

Locally owned Big Z Media operates Radio Station WBGZ 1570AM and 107.1FM and Music Radio Station 94.3FM.  In 2022, Big Z Media acquired  AdVantage News, a free online (daily) and print newspaper, focusing on community features and hyperlocal news. 

Alton also has internet-based resource, Riverbender.com Named for the local bend in the Mississippi River, Riverbender is a portal serving local and national news, sports, obits, classifieds, and events. In 2007 it was the first company to broadcast the Alton High Schools' sports games live online.

Film and television
The 1979 feature film Dreamer, starring Tim Matheson, Susan Blakely and Jack Warden, was primarily shot on location in Alton. The McPike Mansion and Mineral Springs Hotel were featured on the Travel Channel series, Ghost Adventures. Alton was featured on the third season of the Hulu series Small Business Revolution.

Notable people

 Jesse Anderson, murderer who stabbed his wife to death in 1992; murdered in prison alongside serial killer Jeffrey Dahmer by Christopher Scarver in 1994
 David J. Apple, pioneer in ophthalmological research and ophthalmic pathology; medical historian and biographer; born in Alton
 Frank Ballard, puppeteer, professor at the University of Connecticut, and founder of the first puppetry bachelor of fine arts program in the United States
 Amos E. Benbow, Illinois state legislator
 Alexander Botkin, Wisconsin state senator
 George T. Brown, newspaper editor, mayor of Alton 1846–47, U.S. Senate sergeant-of-arms 1861–69
 Joseph Brown, miller, steamboat captain, mayor of Alton 1856–57, mayor of St. Louis 1871–75
 Samuel A. Buckmaster, prison warden, and state legislator
 Jonathan Russell Bullock, Rhode Island state legislator and US federal judge; served on the Alton city council
 Dick Burwell, pitcher for the Chicago Cubs
 John W. Coppinger, lawyer, Illinois state legislator, mayor of Alton
 Anthony W. Daly, Illinois state representative, judge, and lawyer
 Levi Davis, Illinois State Auditor and lawyer
 Miles Davis, jazz musician
 Steve Davis, Illinois state legislator
 AnnMaria De Mars, technology executive, author and judoka
 Ezekiel Elliott, NFL running back for the Dallas Cowboys
 Herbert G. Giberson, Illinois state senator and businessman
 David Goins, first African-American mayor of Alton
 Lloyd Nelson Hand, Chief of Protocol of the United States (1965–66) and assistant to U.S. Senate Majority Leader Lyndon B. Johnson (1957–61)
 Craig Hentrich, NFL football player
 Charles A. Herb, merchant, mayor of Alton, Illinois State Senator
 Michael Ann Holly, art historian and mother of actress Lauren Holly
 Mary Beth Hughes, actress
 Donald Juel, Lutheran educator and scholar
 Don Lenhardt, outfielder, first baseman, third baseman, scout and coach with several MLB teams
 Lawrence Leritz, dance and Broadway
 Stephen Harriman Long, U.S. army explorer, topographical engineer, and railway engineer, retired and died in Alton
 Elijah Lovejoy, abolitionist
 Bill Lyons, infielder for the St. Louis Cardinals
 Trevor Mann, a.k.a. Ricochet, professional wrestler in the WWE
 Barrelhouse Buck McFarland, blues and boogie-woogie pianist and singer
 Jumbo McGinnis, pitcher for the St. Louis Brown Stockings
 Salim Nourallah, musician and producer
 Edward O'Hare, Medal of Honor recipient; O'Hare Airport in Chicago is named in his honor; graduate of Western Military Academy in Alton
 John M. Olin, inventor, industrialist, philanthropist
 William S. Paley, founder and chairman of the board of directors of CBS Corp.; graduate of Western Military Academy in Alton
 James Earl Ray, committed the assassination of Martin Luther King Jr.
 Arch Reilly, infielder for the Pittsburgh Pirates
 Red Rhodes, musician and steel guitarist
 Christina Romer, 25th Chair of the Council of Economic Advisors
 Rosey Rowswell, baseball broadcaster for Pittsburgh Pirates
 Andrew Schlafly, son of Phyllis Schlafly, attorney, homeschool teacher, Christian conservative activist, and founder of Conservapedia
 Phyllis Schlafly, conservative author, constitutional lawyer, and activist, known for her role in defeating the Equal Rights Amendment in the late 1970s and early 1980s
 Thomas N. Scortia, authored novel adapted into film The Towering Inferno
 William Sears, doctor and author of several popular books on pregnancy and parenting
 Dale Swann, character actor
 Richard Thatcher, Union Civil War soldier and first president of Territorial Normal School, now the University of Central Oklahoma
 Paul Tibbets Jr., pilot of the Enola Gay; graduated from Western Military Academy in Alton
 Lyman Trumbull, United States Senator from Illinois and coauthor of the Thirteenth Amendment to the United States Constitution
 Robert Wadlow, at 8 feet and 11.1 inches, the tallest known person in history
 Minor Watson, stage and screen actor
 Jesse White, 37th Secretary of State of Illinois
 Beals Wright, Hall of Fame tennis player, died in Alton
 Rick Yager, cartoonist

See also

 Alton (Amtrak station)
 Alton Township, Madison County, Illinois

References

Further reading
 Eliza Oddy, A Mississippi Diary: From St Paul, Minnesota to Alton, Illinois, October 1894 to May 1895. Edited by Andrew Hook, with an Afterword by Heather Eggins. (The Grimsay Press, 2013).

External links

 Official website for the City of Alton
 Mr. Lincoln and Freedom: Lincoln-Douglas Debate in Alton
 1994 reenactment of Lincoln-Douglas Debate in Alton televised by C-SPAN (Debate preview and Debate review)
 

 
Cities in Illinois
Cities in Madison County, Illinois
Populated places established in 1818
Illinois populated places on the Mississippi River
Populated places on the Underground Railroad
1818 establishments in Illinois Territory